The Medgidia (also: Valea Medgidiei) is a small river in Constanța County, Romania. It discharges into the Danube–Black Sea Canal in Remus Opreanu.

References

Rivers of Constanța County
Rivers of Romania